Brendon Ah Chee (born 21 December 1993) is an Australian rules footballer playing for the West Coast Eagles in the Australian Football League (AFL). He previously played for the Port Adelaide Football Club from 2012 to 2017.

An agile midfielder or forward, Ah Chee was recruited from South Fremantle Football Club in the 2011 AFL draft. His ancestors were Australian Aboriginal, Chinese, Dutch, and Scottish. His great-grandfather was Chinese. He is the older brother of Brisbane Lions player Callum Ah Chee.
Ah Chee has the nickname Polly, because of his ability to handball unusually long distances like Graham "Polly" Farmer.

In season 2015, Ah Chee began his fourth season at Port Adelaide without a senior game to his name and needing to make an impression just to retain his spot on the list at season’s end. Following some strong SANFL form, he was selected to make his AFL debut against North Melbourne in round 3. He started as substitute but had a late impact, setting up the winning goal with what eventually became his trademark long range handball. Ah Chee played a further 10 games and began to establish himself as an AFL player late in the season, collecting 24 disposals, 3 goals and 3 Brownlow Medal votes against Greater Western Sydney and then 25 disposals and a goal against Hawthorn. His combination of a strong body, athletic prowess, and a lightning handball made Ah Chee a valuable contributor to the Power.

In 2017, Ah Chee requested a trade from Port Adelaide, citing a lack of opportunity as the primary reason. At the start of the trade period, he then nominated the West Coast Eagles as his preferred club. Ah Chee was traded to West Coast in October.

References

External links

1993 births
Indigenous Australian players of Australian rules football
Australian people of Chinese descent
Australian people of Dutch descent
Australian people of Scottish descent
Port Adelaide Football Club players
Port Adelaide Football Club players (all competitions)
West Coast Eagles players
Australian rules footballers from Western Australia
Living people
Port Adelaide Football Club (SANFL) players
East Perth Football Club players
West Coast Eagles (WAFL) players